Berry Ricardo Jona Sonnenschein (born 12 February 1994) is a footballer who most recently played as a defender for Achilles Veen. Born in the Netherlands, he is a Bonaire international.

Career
Sonnenschein started his career with Swazi side Mbabane Swallows. In 2015, he joined UAB Blazers in the United States. Before the second half of 2015–16, Sonnenschein signed for Belgian club Turnhout. In 2016, he signed for Miami Dutch Lions FC in the United States, helping them win the league.

Before the second half of 2016–17, he signed for Dutch sixth tier team . In 2017, Sonnenschein signed for Kozakken Boys in the Dutch third tier. In 2018, Sonnenschein signed for Dutch fifth tier outfit Achilles Veen.

Career statistics

Scores and results list Bonaire's goal tally first, score column indicates score after each Sonnenschein goal.

References

Living people
1994 births
Sportspeople from Kerkrade
Bonaire footballers
Dutch footballers
Association football defenders
Bonaire international footballers
Tweede Divisie players
Vierde Divisie players
UAB Blazers men's soccer players
Mbabane Swallows players
KFC Turnhout players
Kozakken Boys players
Achilles Veen players
Dutch expatriate footballers
Dutch expatriate sportspeople in Belgium
Expatriate footballers in Belgium
Dutch expatriate sportspeople in the United States
Expatriate soccer players in the United States
Expatriate footballers in Eswatini